Danilson da Cruz Gomes (born 28 June 1986) is a former professional footballer who played as a defensive midfielder. Born in France, he played for the Cape Verde national team internationally. He also holds French citizenship.

Club career
Da Cruz helped Stade de Reims win the 2017–18 Ligue 2, helping promote them to the Ligue 1 for the 2018–19 season.

On 10 September 2019, da Cruz joined Championnat National side US Concarneau.

International career
Da Cruz received his first call-up to the Cape Verde national team in August 2017. He debuted for Cape Verde in a 2–1 2018 FIFA World Cup qualification victory over South Africa on 1 September 2017.

Honours
Reims
 Ligue 2: 2017–18

References

External links
 Danilson da Cruz profile at Foot-National.com
 
 
 
 

1986 births
Living people
Sportspeople from Créteil
French sportspeople of Cape Verdean descent
Cape Verdean footballers
French footballers
Footballers from Val-de-Marne
Association football midfielders
Cape Verde international footballers
Ligue 2 players
Championnat National players
Championnat National 2 players
Championnat National 3 players
US Créteil-Lusitanos players
Red Star F.C. players
Stade de Reims players
AS Nancy Lorraine players
US Concarneau players